USS Montana may refer to:

 , was a  that provided convoy escort duty during World War I, and was eventually renamed and reclassified Missoula (CA-13) in reserve fleet
 , was a cargo ship during World War I and sunk by torpedo in August 1918
 , was a  battleship laid down in 1920 but cancelled and scrapped in 1923
 USS Montana (BB-67), would have been the lead ship of the s; however, the entire class was cancelled in 1943
 , is a 

United States Navy ship names